The Rotenfluh (also spelled Rotenflue) is a mountain in the Swiss Prealps, located east of Schwyz in Central Switzerland. It is part of the range surrounding the valley of Alpthal, culminating at the Gross Mythen. The Rotenfluh is a popular vantage point over the Lake Lucerne region.

The mountain  is part of a ski area and is easily accessible from Rickenbach near Schwyz by the Rotenfluebahn, a gondola lift. Unlike the previous cable car, which culminated at an elevation of 1,527 metres, the current facility reaches a higher elevation, the upper station being within a few metres from the top. Several restaurants lie in the summit area.

See also
List of mountains of Switzerland accessible by public transport
Nathalie Henseler

References

External links
Rotenfluh on Hikr
Rotenfluebahn
Berggasthaus Rotenfluh

Mountains of the Alps
Mountains of the canton of Schwyz
Mountains of Switzerland